Partisan Records is an independent record label with offices in London and Los Angeles, as well as in New York City, where the company was co-founded in 2007 by Tim Putnam and Ian Wheeler. The label, initially run out of Putnam’s South Brooklyn apartment, relocated in 2009 to their flagship office in Williamsburg where they still reside. Holy Sons (‘Decline Of The West’) was the first release on the label, and early success followed shortly thereafter with the release of Deer Tick (‘War Elephant’).

In 2008, while working as the Night Manager for The Knitting Factory venue at their Leonard St. location in Manhattan, Putnam was approached by Knitting Factory Entertainment CEO Morgan Margolis to form a strategic partnership with Partisan. Together they've reissued the Fela Kuti catalogue and revived their label, Knitting Factory Records, which also includes Grammy Award-nominated members of the Kuti family, Femi Kuti and Seun Kuti.

Partisan has since cultivated an eclectic, diverse roster across all genres, prioritizing an artist-friendly philosophy, and achieving international acclaim. In 2019 they earned their first-ever Grammy nomination for ‘Deran’ by Bombino followed by two more nominations in 2020 for ‘A Hero’s Death’ by Fontaines D.C. and ‘Song For Our Daughter’ by Laura Marling. In 2020 they also achieved a #1 UK album for ‘Ultra Mono’ by IDLES.

Music Week’s International Woman of The Year award went to Partisan's Managing Director, Zena White in 2019.

Putnam now serves as President of Partisan, and Wheeler manages The Talkhouse, which he founded in 2015 and shares an office with Partisan.

Roster

Current 
 Aoife Nessa Frances
 Beth Orton
 The Black Angels
 Blondshell
 Body Meat
 Bombino
 Chubby and the Gang
 Cigarettes After Sex
 Cymande
 Dilly Dally
 Ezra Collective
 Fela Kuti
 Femi Kuti
 Fontaines D.C.
 Geese
 IDLES
 John Grant
 Just Mustard
 Laura Marling
 Léa Sen
 LUMP
 Made Kuti
 Maple Glider
 NoSo
 Sam Burton
 Skinny Pelembe
 Sun's Signature
 Ultraísta
 Westerman

Alumni

 Aaron Freeman
 Aerial East
 Ages and Ages
 The Amazing
 Baby In Vain
 Bobby
 Body Type
 Callers
 Christopher Denny
 Craig Finn
 Deer Tick
 Dolorean
 Eagulls
 Emily Wells
 Erika Wennerstrom (of Heartless Bastards)
 Emel Mathlouthi
 Field Report
 Goon
 Flock of Dimes
 Guards
 Heartless Bastards
 Holy Sons
 JBM
 Lontalius
 Lumerians
 Mercury Rev
 Middle Brother
 Molly Sarlé
 Mountain Man
 Nico Yaryan
 Paleo
 PHOX
 Pottery (band)
 Pure Bathing Culture
 Sallie Ford and the Sound Outside
 SPIKE FCUK
 Sylvan Esso
 The Dismemberment Plan
 The Standard (band)
 The Wytches
 Treetop Flyers
 Tender
 Torres
 Violents
 Warm Ghost

Discography

References

External links

American independent record labels
Companies based in New York City
Record labels established in 2007